Killer Diller is a 2004 drama film with musical elements that had a limited release in 2006. Produced by Sprocketdyne Entertainment and distributed by Freestyle Releasing, the film was written and directed by Tricia Brock and is based on the novel by Clyde Edgerton.  Bottleneck was its working title.  It was screened at the South by Southwest Film Festival in March 2004 and the Tribeca Film Festival on May 4, 2004.

Plot
Wesley, (William Lee Scott) a car thief and musician sent to live at a halfway house on the campus of a Christian college meets Vernon, (Lucas Black) an autistic piano player in need of a friend.  Together they team up with the struggling halfway house band to create the Killer Diller Blues Band.

Cast
 William Lee Scott as Wesley
 Lucas Black as Vernon Jackson
 Niki J. Crawford as Shanita
 John Michael Higgins as Deermont
 Fred Willard as Ned
 W. Earl Brown as Holister Jackson
 Ashley Johnson as Angie
 Mary Kay Place as Dr. Gwen Bradley
 Taj Mahal as J.R. Cox
 RonReaco Lee as Ben
 Clyde Edgerton as Faculty Member
 Jared Tyler as Raymond

Awards
Tricia Brock won a Crystal Heart Award at the Heartland Film Festival for her work on this film.

References

External links
 
 
 
 

2004 films
2000s musical drama films
American musical drama films
2004 directorial debut films
2000s English-language films
Films about autism
Films about music and musicians
2004 drama films
2006 drama films
2006 films
Films based on American novels
2000s American films